Sarajeh (also Romanized as Sarājeh) is a village in Qanavat Rural District, in the Central District of Qom County, Qom Province, Iran. At the 2006 census, its population was 369, in 89 families.

Notable people
Mohammad Hossein Fahmideh, a war hero of Iran

References 

Populated places in Qom Province